Franklin Leal Sullivan (January 23, 1930 – January 19, 2016), was an American professional baseball right-handed pitcher, who played in Major League Baseball (MLB) for the Boston Red Sox, Philadelphia Phillies, and Minnesota Twins over parts of eleven seasons, spanning –.

After the  season, the Red Sox traded him to the Phillies for another towering right-hander, -tall Gene Conley. Coincidentally, Conley had been the winning pitcher and Sullivan the loser of the 1955 All-Star Game. A walk-off home run by Stan Musial on the first pitch from Sullivan in the bottom of the 12th inning  brought the midsummer classic to an abrupt end. Sullivan had entered the game with two men out in the eighth and had held the National League (NL) scoreless for 3 innings prior to Musial’s clout.

In 1955, Sullivan topped the AL with 260 innings pitched and tied with Whitey Ford for the most wins (18). For his career, he posted a 97–100 win–loss record, with a 3.60 earned run average (ERA), in 351 pitching appearances. He dropped 18 of his 21 National League decisions as a member of the Phillies, but went 94–82 in the American League. Overall, Sullivan permitted 1,702 hits and 559 bases on balls in 1,732 MLB innings pitched. He struck out 959.

In September 2008, Sullivan published a memoir entitled, Life Is More Than 9 Innings.

He was one of the subjects of the 1957 Norman Rockwell painting The Rookie.

Sullivan died in Lihue, Hawaii, from pneumonia on January 19, 2016, at the age of 85.

See also
List of Major League Baseball annual wins leaders

References

External links

Frank Sullivan at SABR (Baseball BioProject)
Frank Sullivan at Baseball Almanac
Frank Sullivan  at Baseball Gauge

1930 births
2016 deaths
Albany Senators players
American League All-Stars
American League wins champions
American military personnel of the Korean War
Baseball players from California
Birmingham Barons players
Boston Red Sox players
Major League Baseball pitchers
Minnesota Twins players
Deaths from pneumonia in Hawaii
Oroville Red Sox players
People from Hollywood, Los Angeles
Philadelphia Phillies players
San Jose Red Sox players
Scranton Miners players
University of Southern California alumni
USC Trojans baseball players